A Dog's Life: The Autobiography of a Stray is a children's novel written in 2005 by Ann M. Martin and is published by Scholastic Books. The target audience for this book is grades 4–7. It is written from the first-person perspective of a female stray dog named Squirrel. Ann M. Martin bases her books on personal experiences and contemporary problems or events.

Martin is a children's author from Princeton, New Jersey. All of the characters in her books are fictional, although some are based on real people. Martin has written many popular children's titles including The Baby-sitters Club series and the California Diaries series. Her book A Corner of the Universe, received a Newbery Honor Award. She had since written a sequel called “Everything For A Dog” that was published in 2011.

Plot

Part 1
Squirrel is a mixed-breed dog who lives in a shed behind the summer home of a wealthy family, there, she lives with her mother, Stream, and brother, Bone. Squirrel and Bone were the only two puppies to survive out of a litter of five. While living in the shed, Their mother teaches Squirrel and Bone how to hunt and find food, as well as to avoid being seen by humans. When Stream dies suddenly, Squirrel and Bone set out on their own. Bone is very adventurous and Squirrel follows him through the woods and from town to town in search of food and shelter. The puppies are eventually picked up by highway travelers named Marcy and George who consider adopting them. They take them home for the night before George decides not to keep the dogs and throws them out of a car window in a mall parking lot. Squirrel and Bone are injured and Bone is taken away by other shoppers immediately after being tossed from the car, leaving Squirrel alone. Squirrel and Bone never see each other again.

Part 2
Alone and hungry, Squirrel meets another female stray, Moon, by the road. The two dogs became fast friends together for warmth and searching for food in garbage cans and trash in the woods.

Part 3
'One day, a truck sees Moon and dodges her. An animal across the road made them run and scared squirrel. They were trying to get to the other side. Squirrel and Moon are taken to the vet by the family who hit them.  There, the veterinarian announces that Moon died, and Squirrel's leg was broken by the truck. Squirrel is by herself, again. Squirrel is spayed and her broken leg is treated. She is renamed Daisy and is adopted by the family for the summer. Squirrel lives in the garage and plays with the family's children every day. In autumn, the family leaves their summer home and Squirrel is abandoned. She wanders for years until she finds herself back at the mall parking lot where she and Bone were separated. Squirrel follows a scent that reminds her of Bone through the woods, but she does not find him...

Part 4
Squirrel, now an old dog, takes cover from the weather in a shed in the back yard of an old woman named Susan. 
Squirrel tries to gain Susan's trust. Susan also tries to gain Squirrel's trust by leaving food out and feeding Squirrel on the porch before Susan tries to coax Squirrel in when the weather turns cold. Susan had a dog named Maxie in the past, so she knew how to take care of dogs. When she finally gets Squirrel inside, Susan decides to keep her and renames her "Addie." Susan and Squirrel spend their days running errands in town and cuddling up on the couch. The two spend the rest of their lives together.

Character list

Squirrel/Daisy/Addie 
Squirrel is the protagonist of the book, and it is written from her point of view. She is a female stray puppy who is one of two surviving puppies in a litter of five. Squirrel enjoys hunting, a skill which she learned from her mother. After her mother goes missing, Squirrel moves from place to place following her brother Bone, and then later with her new friend Moon, before she ventures by herself in her old age, longing for a companion. Squirrel has many tragic events happen in her life, but in the end everything turns out to be okay.

Bone
Bone is the brother of Squirrel. He is a male stray puppy who is one of two surviving puppies in a litter of five. After his mother disappears, Bone leads Squirrel from place to place. He was separated from his sister Squirrel when George threw both of them out of the car window. He has a pretty rough attitude and is very protective of his sister.

Stream 
Stream is the mother of Squirrel and Bone. She cares for her puppies in a wheel burrow in an old shed until they are strong enough to adventure themselves. She teaches them to be aware of humans and how to hunt. She leaves the shed one morning and does not return.

Mine 
Mine is a fox who lived underneath the Merrion's new garden shed and had four kits. The fox was the enemy of the animals living on the property because she was dangerous. She is killed when the Merrion patriarch shoots her.

Matthias Merrion 
The youngest son of the family who owned the shed that Stream, Bone and Squirrel lived in. Matthias discovered Squirrel and Bone but kept the dogs a secret from his family. Matthias brought the dogs scraps of food and toys to play with. Matthias was the dogs' first human interaction.

Yellow Man 
A cat who lived in the shed with the dogs. The cats lived in nesting boxes in the opposite corner of the shed from the dogs. Yellow Man greeted the dogs every morning and was curious of them.

Marcy 
The wife of George. She and George find Squirrel and Bone on the side of the highway and take them home. Marcy wants to keep the dogs, and George doesn't allow her to. Marcy feeds them and cleans up their messes, hoping that they will become tame pets.

George 
The husband of Marcy. He and Marcy find Squirrel and Bone on the side of the highway and take them home. George doesn't think that the dogs are worth the trouble. When Marcy leaves for work, George throws them out the car window at the mall and injures them both.

Moon 
A female stray that Squirrel makes friends with after Bone disappears. Moon was a small dog, who resembled Bone. Moon and Squirrel took turns caring for each other when they were hurt. Moon is described as being brave, adventurous, and loving. Moon and Squirrel travel together from town to town for years, sneaking garbage at night and fighting other dogs when necessary. Moon's best friend was Squirrel. When Moon is killed by the Becker's car when crossing the road, Squirrel is very sad.

Dr. Roth
A veterinarian who looks after Moon and Squirrel when they are brought into the vet by the Becker family. Squirrel remembers Dr. Roth as having gentle hands. Dr. Roth donates her time to fix Squirrel's broken leg, spay her, and give her shots. She also gives Squirrel a clean bill of health before she is taken in by her new family.

Rachael
An employee at the vet clinic that Moon and Squirrel are brought to. Rachael helped nurse Squirrel back to health by taking her for walks and caring for her. She was very sad to see Squirrel leave with the Becker family.

Becker family

 McGrath
Is a kind-old and puts food out for Squirrel times a day on her porch u the  turns cold, after which she invites Squirrel in to her home to warm up. Susan adopts Squirrel, gets her checked by the vet, and they become close companions. Susan and Squirrel do everything together from then on, and live happily together in Susan's home until the end of the book.  renamed Squirrel “ Addie”. Susan is a very unhappy woman.

The Stray Dogs
The stray dogs are dogs who find Moon and Squirrel in the streets and badly injure them.

Miss Oliver
She was trying to convince Susan McGrath to sell her house and get rid of Squirrel/Daisy/Addy.

Reception
A Kirkus Reviews review says, "Heart-wrenching as well as heart-warming". A Publishers Weekly'' review says, "Though Martin is sometimes inconsistent about what Squirrel does and does not know, listeners will be too hooked on the emotional notes and occasional dramatic moments here to mind." This book won the Young Readers Choice Award in 2008.

References

American children's novels
2005 American novels
Novels about dogs
Street dogs
Children's novels about animals
2005 children's books